Breda-SAFAT (Società Italiana Ernesto Breda per Costruzioni Meccaniche / Breda Meccanica Bresciana - Società Anonima Fabbrica Armi Torino) was an Italian weapons manufacturer of the 1930s and 1940s that designed and produced a range of machine-guns and cannon primarily for use in aircraft.

Design and development
During the 1930s both Breda and SAFAT (a division of FIAT) were given the task of producing designs for a new range of machine-guns for use in aircraft of the Regia Aeronautica, the offering from Breda being preferred. FIAT contested the decision but lost, resulting in the sale of SAFAT to Breda to form Breda-SAFAT.

Despite the aim of producing an airborne machine-gun equal or superior to other similar weapons, the use of low propellant capacity rounds resulted in significantly lower muzzle velocities than other weapons of similar calibres. Other inadequacies included high weight and modest rates of fire as well as the ineffectiveness of the High Explosive-Incendiary-Tracer round.

However, despite these shortcomings, the Breda-SAFAT gun was generally praised by the Italian pilots and armourers: the pilots because of its long range and apparent good hitting power, the armourers because of its reliability.

Thus, Italy lacked machine-guns with the critical qualities of light weight, a high rate of fire, good muzzle velocity, good projectile weight and reliability, while the Soviets, Germans, Americans and Japanese had 12.7 mm calibre automatic ordnance in the Berezin UB, MG 131, Browning M2, and Ho-103 respectively. Late-war Italian aircraft began to adopt the "original" calibre German Mauser  MG 151 cannon to give their aircraft parity in firepower with Allied fighters, with as many as three MG 151 fitted to Macchi MC.205, Fiat G.55 and Reggiane Re.2005—the third cannon firing through the propeller hub of the licence-built Daimler-Benz DB 605 engines (Fiat Tifone) inline inverted V12 engines used to power these aircraft—in addition to synchronized cowl-mounted 12.7mm Bredas-SAFATs.

The Breda guns, although adequate in 1935 at the time of their design, were out-classed by the standards of 1940, with Italian fighters such as the Fiat C.R.42, Fiat G.50 Freccia, Macchi MC.200, Macchi MC.202 and Reggiane Re.2000 still only having two 12.7 mm Breda-SAFAT machine-guns and sometimes two extra 7.7 mm Breda-SAFAT machine-guns. Despite their shortcomings, thousands of Breda guns were built in the 1930s and 1940s, arming nearly every Italian fighter and bomber of that period. Many of these weapons were also adapted for the anti-aircraft role and remained in service until the 1970s as reserve weapons; even if all the aircraft that they equipped had been phased out by that time.

Applications

Fighters
 Fiat CR.32
 Fiat CR.42
 Fiat G.50 Freccia
 Fiat G.55
 Macchi C.200
 Macchi C.202
 Macchi C.205
 Reggiane Re.2000
 Reggiane Re.2002
 Reggiane Re.2005

Bombers
 Caproni Ca.133
 Caproni Ca.309
 Caproni Ca.310
 Fiat BR.20
 Piaggio P.108
 Savoia-Marchetti SM.79

Ground-attack
 Breda Ba.64
 Breda Ba.65

Notes

References 
 
 Gustavsson, Håkan; Slongo, Ludvico (2012). Gladiator vs Cr.42 Falco : 1940-41. .

External links

Italian Wikipedia image of a SAFAT machine gun in the ground role

Aircraft guns
Heavy machine guns
Medium machine guns
Machine guns of Italy
Breda weapons
World War II machine guns
12.7×81 mm firearms